Three Wise Fools (German title: Ein Mädchen und drei alte Narren) is a 1923 American silent drama film directed by King Vidor. A print of the film exists at the Cinematheque Royale de Belgique. It showed in Germany at the Union-Theater Nollendorf, Berlin, on November 10, 1924. The cinema was built in 1913 by Joe Goldsoll, who was president of Goldwyn Pictures from 1922-1924.

Plot
Three elderly—confirmed bachelors all—are unexpectedly visited by a young woman who announces herself as the daughter of the lady that all three men had once been in love with. When the girl is falsely suspected of involvement with a robbery, the old men come to her aid and the real culprit is ultimately apprehended.

Cast
 Claude Gillingwater as Theodore Findley
 Eleanor Boardman as Rena Fairchild / Sydney Fairfield
 William H. Crane as Hon. James Trumbull
 Alec B. Francis as Dr. Richard Gaunt
 John St. Polis as John Crawshay (as John Sainpolis)
 William Haines as Gordon Schuyler
 Lucien Littlefield as Douglas
 ZaSu Pitts as Mickey
 Martha Mattox as Saunders
 Creighton Hale as Young Trumbull
 Raymond Hatton as Young Gaunt

Production
One of producer Samuel Goldwyn’s many outstanding literary acquisitions, Three Wise Fools was written by playwrights Austin Strong and Winchell Smith. Vidor approached the “prestigious property” with alacrity. He would make one more film for Samuel Goldwyn Productions, Wild Oranges (1924) shortly before Goldwyn’s outfit was absorbed by Louis B. Mayer under Metro-Goldwyn-Mayer studios.

Three Wise Fools is noted as an early high-profile role for the then-up and coming William Haines. Haines would later recall that he felt distracted by the top hat he wears in the film and, as a result, felt that his performance was terrible. However, his performance received positive notices in contemporary reviews, and Haines was offered a choice of four new film roles after the film's success.[3] 
The other members of the movie cast also enjoyed successful careers, including Eleanor Boardman, Creighton Hale, Raymond Hatton, Zazu Pitts and Claude Gillingwater, the only cast member from the original 1918 Broadway play. Claude Gillingwater was the only cast member from the original 1918 Broadway play.

It showed in Germany at the Union-Theater Nollendorf, Berlin, on November 10, 1924.[4] The cinema was built in 1913 by Joe Goldsoll, who was president of Goldwyn Pictures from 1922-1924.[5]

Reception
Moving Picture World wrote approvingly “King Vidor has reproduced the atmosphere, comedy and romance [of the stageplay] with great success, and elaborated considerably on the suspense angle.”

Footnotes

References
Baxter, John. 1976. King Vidor. Simon & Schuster, Inc. Monarch Film Studies. LOC Card Number 75-23544.
Durgnat, Raymond and Simmon, Scott. 1988. King Vidor, American. University of California Press, Berkeley.

External links

Film still at silenthollywood.com

1923 films
1923 drama films
Silent American drama films
American silent feature films
American black-and-white films
Films directed by King Vidor
Goldwyn Pictures films
1920s American films